The 1908 Prince Edward Island general election was held in the Canadian province of Prince Edward Island on November 18, 1908.

The election was won by the governing Liberals, led by incumbent Premier Francis Haszard. Haszard had taken over from his predecessor, Arthur Peters, following his death in January 1908.

Haszard resigned as Premier in 1911 following appointment to the province's Supreme Court, and he was succeeded as Premier by H. James Palmer. Due to his designation as Premier, Palmer ran in a by-election in his district of 3rd Queens; traditionally, the Opposition does not run a candidate in these triggered by-elections, but the Conservatives did in the December, 1911 by-election and defeated Palmer in his own district.

The opposition Conservatives, led by John A. Mathieson, gained five seats in this election.

Party Standings

Members Elected

The Legislature of Prince Edward Island had two levels of membership from 1893 to 1996 - Assemblymen and Councillors. This was a holdover from when the Island had a bicameral legislature, the General Assembly and the Legislative Council.

In 1893, the Legislative Council was abolished and had its membership merged with the Assembly, though the two titles remained separate and were elected by different electoral franchises. Assembleymen were elected by all eligible voters of within a district, while Councillors were only elected by landowners within a district.

Kings

Prince

Queens

Sources

Further reading
 

1908 elections in Canada
Elections in Prince Edward Island
1908 in Prince Edward Island
November 1908 events